Karl Schuelke (September 5, 1914 – February 18, 1992) was a fullback in the National Football League. He was a member of the Pittsburgh Pirates during the 1939 NFL season.

References

People from Marshfield, Wisconsin
Players of American football from Wisconsin
Pittsburgh Pirates (football) players
American football fullbacks
Wisconsin Badgers football players
1914 births
1992 deaths